Paul Edwin Gregory [Pop] (June 9, 1908 – September 16, 1999) was a pitcher in Major League Baseball who played from 1932 through 1933 for the Chicago White Sox.

Born in Tomnolen, Mississippi, Paul Gregory was a three-sport star at Mississippi State University, lettering in football, basketball and baseball from 1926 to 1930.

After graduating, Gregory spent thirty five years in baseball as a player and college coach. He also coached college basketball for nine years and was a World War II veteran.

Gregory started his professional baseball career in 1931 with Class-A Atlanta Crackers, posting an 8–6 record and a 5.17 earned run average in 45 games (11 starts).

With the White Sox in 1932 and 1933, Gregory was just 9–14 with a 4.72 ERA. His career highlight came on May 26, 1933, when he defeated Red Ruffing and the host New York Yankees, 8–6, allowing one earned run in seven-plus innings while retiring Babe Ruth in five at-bats.

Following his majors stint, Gregory returned to play on the minor league system for nine years before serving in the US Navy during World War II, from 1943 to 1945. After military discharge he pitched for Triple-A Seattle Rainiers and Hollywood Stars between 1946 and 1947.

After his playing retirement, Gregory began his coaching career in 1947.

Gregory was in charge of the basketball squad from 1947 to 1955, then he led the Bulldogs baseball team to 15 winning seasons from 1954 through 1974, including four Southeastern Conference titles (1965–66, 1970–71) and a berth to the 1971 College World Series.

A four-time SEC Coach of the Year, Gregory was inducted into the American Baseball Coaches Association Hall of Fame in 1977 and the Mississippi Sports Hall of Fame and Museum in 1982.
 
Paul Gregory died in Southaven, Mississippi, at the age of 91.

MLB statistics

Head coaching record

Baseball

Basketball

References

1908 births
1999 deaths
American men's basketball coaches
Major League Baseball pitchers
Chicago White Sox players
Atlanta Crackers players
Hollywood Stars players
Milwaukee Brewers (AA) players
Sacramento Senators players
Seattle Indians players
Seattle Rainiers players
Mississippi State Bulldogs baseball coaches
Mississippi State Bulldogs men's basketball coaches
People from Webster County, Mississippi
Baseball players from Mississippi
Basketball coaches from Mississippi
Basketball players from Mississippi
Players of American football from Mississippi
Mississippi State Bulldogs baseball players
Mississippi State Bulldogs men's basketball players
Mississippi State Bulldogs football players
United States Navy personnel of World War II
American men's basketball players